The Dueodde Lighthouse is located on the Danish island of Bornholm. It was built during the years 1960–62 and commissioned on 15 August 1962. It is the nodal point of the southeast coast line, warning ships to keep away from the extreme southern tip of the island. Dueodde Lighthouse is Denmark's tallest lighthouse and one of the most important lighthouses of the Baltic Sea.

Geography 
Bornholm features varied topography, such as Almindingen, Hammeren, Jons Kapel, Paradisbakkerne, Rytterknægten, and Dueodde. The lighthouse was built on the western side of Dueodde's sand dunes, on the island's extreme southern tip.

Construction 
After the completion of the foundation, the tower construction was taken up and completed speedily using sliding form work procedure to raise the hexagonal shaped cylindrical concrete tower to a height of  without the fixtures. Materials used for construction included  of cement concrete and 50 tonnes of reinforcement steel.

Architecture and fittings 
The lighthouse is equipped with a Fresnel Rotary lens at a focal height of 48 m. The Fresnel lens (1886) of the Dueodde Nord lighthouse was transferred to this tower. The lens provides three white flashes every ten seconds. There are 197 steps to the top of the tower from where there is a panoramic view, weather permitting, of the sea and the sandy white beaches. It is the only lighthouse on Bornholm that is open to the public, but at irregular times.

Gallery

See also 

List of lighthouses and lightvessels in Denmark

References 

Lighthouses completed in 1962
Lighthouses in Denmark
Buildings and structures in Bornholm